The 2010 Skate America was the fourth event of six in the 2010–11 ISU Grand Prix of Figure Skating, a senior-level international invitational competition series. It was held at the Rose Garden Arena in Portland, Oregon on November 11–14. Medals were awarded in the disciplines of men's singles, ladies' singles, pair skating, and ice dancing. Skaters earned points toward qualifying for the 2010–11 Grand Prix Final.

Schedule
All times are Pacific Standard Time.

 Thursday, November 11
 9:00 a.m. - 4:00 p.m. – Official practice
 Friday, November 12
 9:00 a.m. - 3:00 p.m. – Official practice
 7:00 p.m. – Pairs' short program & Men's short program (Session 1)
 Saturday, November 13
 8:00 a.m. - 1:30 p.m. – Official practice
 2:00 p.m. – Short dance & Ladies' short program (Session 2)
 7:00 p.m. – Men's free skating & Pairs' free skating (Session 3)
 Sunday, November 14
 11:00 a.m. – Ladies' free skating & Free dance (Session 4)
 5:00 p.m. – Skating spectacular

Results

Men

Ladies

Pairs

Ice dancing

References

External links

 
 ISU entries/results page
 Portland named host city for 2010 Skate America
 
 
 
 
 

Skate America, 2010
Skate America
Skate America
Sports competitions in Oregon
Skate America